Luis Onmura  (born June 29, 1960) is a retired judoka from Brazil. He represented Brazil at the 1980, 1984 and the 1988 Summer Olympics. Onmura won the bronze medal in the men's lightweight division (– 71 kg), alongside Great Britain's Kerrith Brown at the 1984 Games.

References

External links
 Profile

1960 births
Living people
Judoka at the 1980 Summer Olympics
Judoka at the 1984 Summer Olympics
Judoka at the 1988 Summer Olympics
Olympic judoka of Brazil
Olympic bronze medalists for Brazil
Brazilian people of Japanese descent
Place of birth missing (living people)
Olympic medalists in judo
Brazilian male judoka
Medalists at the 1984 Summer Olympics
Pan American Games silver medalists for Brazil
Pan American Games medalists in judo
Judoka at the 1979 Pan American Games
Judoka at the 1983 Pan American Games
Judoka at the 1987 Pan American Games
Medalists at the 1983 Pan American Games
Medalists at the 1987 Pan American Games
20th-century Brazilian people
21st-century Brazilian people